The Adventures of Spunky and Tadpole is an animated television series produced by Beverly Hills Productions and syndicated beginning on September 6, 1958. The show's characters were a boy and a bear who hunted down bad guys. The show was made in three and a half-minute episodes, with ten parts comprising each story. It was most frequently shown one episode a day as part of a local station's afternoon children's programming. The show remained in production until 1961.

According to Television Cartoon Shows: An Illustrated Encyclopedia, 1949 Through 2003:
"Ultra-chintzy both in concept and execution... Spunky and Tadpole was given a big-bucks promotional sendoff in 1958 by its first syndicator, Guild Films. A major TV distributor of the period thanks to such valuable properties as the Liberace Show and the Warner Bros. Looney Tunes theatrical cartoons, Guild secured bookings for Spunky and Tadpole in several top markets, promising a series that would appeal equally to grownups and children. Competition from stronger syndies like Huckleberry Hound and the Three Stooges shorts caused Spunky and Tadpole to fall by the wayside, and when Guild disappeared in a merger at the end of the 1950s, the cartoons were shunted around to several minor distributors. Offered at bargain rates to less affluent stations in smaller markets, Spunky and Tadpole continued to play unobtrusively into the mid-1960s."

Actress Corinne Calvet and her husband were originally vice-presidents of Beverly Hills Productions, but withdrew from the company after shady fund-raising practices on the part of president and producer Ed Janis attracted the attention of the Better Business Bureau and were reported on by Variety.

Voices
The voice cast included:
Joan Gardner – Spunky
Don Messick – Tadpole
Ed Janis – Tadpole

Episodes

References

External links
Spunky and Tadpole at Don Markstein's Toonopedia. Archived from the original on August 8, 2017.

https://tralfaz.blogspot.com/2015/06/psst-wanna-buy-cartoon.html

1950s American animated television series
1960s American animated television series
1958 American television series debuts
1961 American television series endings
American children's animated adventure television series
American children's animated comedy television series
Animated television series about bears
Animated television series about children
First-run syndicated television programs in the United States